The West Coast Conference on Formal Linguistics, or WCCFL (pronounced /ˈwɪkfəl/) is an annual linguistics conference, usually held in the spring, at a university in western North America. Research presented there can focus on any aspect of natural language analysis, including, but not limited to, phonetics, phonology, morphology, syntax, semantics and discourse structure. Along with NELS, it is one of two major U.S. regional conferences that focus on general linguistics, with an emphasis, in recent years, on syntactic topics.

History
WCCFL was first held in 1982. Proceedings for conferences 4-17 were published by the Center for the Study of Language and Information at Stanford (CSLI); proceedings for conferences 18 and beyond have appeared with Cascadilla Press.

The years in which WCCFL has been held are listed below, together with the host institution and the invited speakers (where this information is available or applicable).

References

Linguistics conferences